The Guv'nor may refer to:

The Guv'nor (film), a 1935 film starring George Arliss
"the Guv'nor", nickname of footballer Diego Costa
"the Guv'nor", nickname of cricketer Bobby Abel
"the Guv'nor", nickname of former footballer and manager Paul Ince
"the Guv'nor", nickname of Lenny McLean, bareknuckle boxer, criminal, author, and actor
a series of albums by Ashley Hutchings, including:
The Guv'nor vol 1
The Guv'nor vol 2
The Guv'nor vol 3
The Guv'nor vol 4
A popular 1980's overdrive guitar pedal from Marshall Amplification.

See also
Guv'ner
The Guvnors